Dexterville may refer to:

Places
United States
Dexterville, Kentucky
Dexterville, New York
Dexterville, Wisconsin

See also
Dexter (disambiguation)